Sapsan Arena is a football stadium situated in Moscow, Russia. It hosts Kazanka Moscow, Lokomotiv Moscow's farm club, and Lokomotiv Moscow's youth team. It seats 6,000 people.

History 
The stadium was built in 2009 and its initial capacity stood at 5000, all seated. It is the home stadium of the youth squad of Lokomotiv. It was also used by Lokomotiv-2, prior to their disbandment. The stadium was further expanded in the winter of 2010, and as a result nowadays the stadium is capable to hold 6,000 people, all seated. In addition to the expansion, all the three stands were covered under a roof. 

On 5 August 2017, Lokomotiv announced that the stadium has been renamed to Sapsan Arena

Description 
It is situated adjacent to the main Lokomotiv Moscow stadium, the RZD Arena. Its surface is artificial turf.

References

External links
Stadium information

FC Lokomotiv Moscow
Football venues in Russia
Sports venues in Moscow